The HIW Canadian Grand Championship was a professional wrestling championship created by the Canadian professional wrestling promotion High Impact Wrestling.  The inaugural champion was Shaun Moore who won the title on August 31, 2018 at the Pile O'Bones Rumble XXIII.  Canadian Wrestling's Elite acquired HIW's assets and continued to promote the title until it was unified with the CWE Central Canadian Heavyweight Championship on October 31, 2021 at CWE's Rumble to Remember.

Title history

Names

Reigns

|}

References

Canadian professional wrestling championships
Canadian Grand